The motion to impeach is used to bring an accusation against a person. A majority vote is needed to put the accused on trial. A majority vote convicts for a minor offense, and a two-thirds vote for a major offense. A vote of censure or reprimand requires majority vote, and suspension or expulsion a two-thirds vote. 

Robert's Rules of Order does not have a motion to impeach. However, this book requires a fair disciplinary process which includes appointing a committee to conduct a confidential investigation, report of the committee and preferral of charges if warranted, formal notification of the accused, and trial; and a two-thirds vote is required to expel.

See also
 Impeachment

References

Impeachment